The 1997 Paegas Czech Open was a men's tennis tournament played on Clay in Prague, Czech Republic that was part of the International Series of the 1997 ATP Tour.
Yevgeny Kafelnikov and Daniel Vacek were the defending champions, but lost in the first round to Petr Luxa and David Škoch.

Mahesh Bhupathi and Leander Paes won the title by defeating Luxa and Škoch 6–1, 6–1 in the final.

Seeds

Draw

Draw

References

External links
 Official results archive (ATP)
 Official results archive (ITF)

Doubles
Prague Open (1987–1999)
1997 in Czech tennis